Eucryphia glutinosa, the brush bush or nirrhe, is a species of flowering plant in the family Cunoniaceae, native to moist woodland habitats in Chile. Single (or occasionally double) four-petalled, fragrant white flowers with prominent stamens appear in late summer.

The Latin specific epithet glutinosa means “sticky, glutinous”.

The hardiest of its genus, it is a popular subject for cultivation in parks and gardens, valued for its foliage and late flowering. It requires moist, acidic soil with roots shaded from the sun. It has gained the Royal Horticultural Society's Award of Garden Merit

References

glutinosa
Endemic flora of Chile
Near threatened flora of South America
Taxa named by Eduard Friedrich Poeppig
Taxa named by Henri Ernest Baillon
Taxa named by Stephan Endlicher
Flora of the Valdivian temperate rainforest